Raise Your Fist is the twelfth studio album by the German female heavy metal singer Doro, released on 19 October 2012 and 6 November 2012 in USA through Nuclear Blast Records. The song "Hero" is dedicated to the late Ronnie James Dio.

On 5 May 2014, Nuclear Blast issued a special edition of the album to celebrate the 30th anniversary of Doro's first live show, which included a second CD titled Powerful Passionate Favorites containing remixes, covers and a demo. It was published in coincide with the German singer's two special celebratory concerts held at CCD Stadthalle of her hometown Düsseldorf.

Track listing

Personnel
Band members
 Doro Pesch – vocals
 Bas Maas – guitars
 Luca Princiotta – guitars, keyboards
 Nick Douglas – bass
 Johnny Dee – drums

Additional musicians
 Thorsten Bauer – guitar, bass, backing vocals
 Felix Born – drums
 Uwe Fichtner – backing vocals
 Gus G. – guitar solo on track 6 
 Mike "Metal" Goldberg – drums
 Lemmy Kilmister – vocals on track 4
 Alexander Krull – backing vocals
 Lucie Roubickova – backing vocals on tracks 3 and 6
 Filip Sembera – guitar on track 3
 Torsten Sickert – guitars, bass and drums on track 3, keyboards
 Klaus Vanscheidt – guitars and backing vocals on track 3
 Harrison Young – keyboards

Production
 Thorsten Bauer – engineer on track 6
 Andreas Bruhn – producer, engineer and mixing on tracks 2, 5, 7, 8, 9, 11, 14, engineer on tracks 1, 6 and 10, mixing on track 15
 Jens Dreesen – mastering
 Mike Goldberg – engineer on tracks 12, 13
 Jacob Hansen – mixing on tracks 1, 3, 4, 5, 9, 10
 Rudy Kronenberger – mixing on track 13
 Alexander Krull – engineer, mixing and mastering on track 6
 Jochen Kux – engineer and mixing on tracks 2, 5, 7, 8, 9, 11, 14, engineer on tracks 1 and 6, mixing on track 15
 Bas Maas – engineer
 Doro Pesch – producer
 Chris Rakestraw – vocal engineer
 Torsten Sickert – arranger, producer and engineer on track 3
 Kendal Stubbs – programming on track 12
 Afshin Tahmasebi – engineer on tracks 10 and 15

References

External links
American site

Doro (musician) albums
2012 albums
Nuclear Blast albums